La Tawa is the first live album from French rock group Zebda and their last work as a band prior to their 2011 reformation. It was released in 2003 and produced by Zebda.

The set contains two discs. The first, La Tawa, named after the publishing company set up by the band, is a live album featuring 18 songs recorded during concerts in Clermont-Ferrand, Dijon and St-Étienne. The second disc, Zebda live à l'Apolo, is a DVD showing a concert they had in Barcelona.

Track listing
La Tawa
 Toulouse 4'30
 On est chez nous 3'24
 Y'a pas d'arrangements 4'51
 Double peine 3'45
 Mêlée ouverte 4'43
 Sheitan 4'26
 Mon père m'a dit 5'26
 Oualalaradime 4'27
 Né dans la rue 3'42
 Ma rue 4'06
 Mala Diural (À la Skabyle) 3'34
 Dans ma classe 3'52
 Taslima 3'38
 Le bruit et l'odeur 4'05
 L'erreur est humaine 6'04
 Du soleil à la toque 3'59
 Motivés 4'29
 Tomber la chemise 8'18

Live à l'Apolo
Toulouse 4'30
Y'a pas d'arrangements 4'51
On est chez nous 3'24
Sheitan 4'26
Mêlée ouverte 4'43
L'erreur est humaine 6'04
Ma rue 4'06
Tomber la chemise 10'30
Motivés 4'29

Zebda albums
2003 live albums